Experimenter: The Stanley Milgram Story is a 2015 American biographical drama film written and directed by Michael Almereyda, based on the 1961 Milgram experiment. The film stars Peter Sarsgaard, Winona Ryder, Taryn Manning, Kellan Lutz, Anton Yelchin, John Leguizamo, Lori Singer, Dennis Haysbert, Anthony Edwards, and Jim Gaffigan. The film was released on October 16, 2015, by Magnolia Pictures. It is also one of the final films to feature Lori Singer before her retirement in 2017.

Plot
The film is based on the true story of famed social psychologist Stanley Milgram, who in 1961 conducted a series of radical behavior experiments at Yale University that tested the willingness of ordinary humans to obey an authority figure while administering electric shocks to strangers. In the first half of the film, it is shown how the experiments are conducted, with nearly every test subject succumbing to the pressure of the circumstances and administering shocks to a stranger, despite the stranger begging him to stop. Between the experiments, it is shown how Milgram meets Alexandra (or Sasha), who will become his wife and mother of two children.

The second half of the film shows how Milgram struggles with the public outcry about the ethics of the experiments and how his career advances as he becomes a professor in New York City and continues to study social interactions and social pressure in more benign experimental settings, including the small-world experiment, the lost-letter experiment, the street-corner (or gawking) experiment, the familiar stranger experiment, and various experiments that he makes his students carry out.

Archive footage occurs frequently, either as recordings that Milgram watches or as a backdrop for entire scenes. Milgram's work continues until he dies from a heart attack at the age of 51. In the final scene, the street-corner experiment is repeated in the present day, with a cameo of the real-life Sasha Milgram. In a mid-credits scene, more archival footage is shown.

Cast

Production
Although director Michael Almereyda was aware of Milgram's work, it wasn't until his girlfriend began taking a class on him that Almereyda  became interested. Subsequently, he found himself reading Milgram's Obedience to Authority: An Experimental View. According to Almereyda once he started reading "[he] instantly saw how filmable it was" becoming increasingly interested in making it into a film the more he went on. In filming, Almereyda wanted it to be "playful" in nature as he felt that's how Stanley Milgram himself would have made it.

Almereyda decided to have Milgram break the fourth wall based on viewing films of his in which Milgram would talk to the camera, reminding him of Rod Serling or Alfred Hitchcock. From this Almereyda figured having the character talk to the camera "seemed natural and in fact essential to include that in the movie." On May 13, 2014, Peter Sarsgaard and Winona Ryder joined the cast. On June 30, Kellan Lutz, Taryn Manning, Anton Yelchin, Anthony Edwards, and Edoardo Ballerini joined the cast. Principal photography began on June 5, 2014, in New York City.

Release
The film premiered at the Sundance Film Festival on January 25, 2015. On March 26, 2015, Magnolia Pictures acquired distribution rights to the film. The film was released on October 16, 2015, in a limited release and through video on demand.

Reception
Experimenter received positive reviews. On Rotten Tomatoes, the film holds an 85% approval rating based on 80 reviews, with an average rating of 7.20/10. The consensus reads: "Led by a gripping performance from Peter Sarsgaard, Experimenter uses a fact-based story to pose thought-provoking questions about human nature." On Metacritic, the film has a score of 81 out of 100 calculated from 20 reviews, indicating "universal acclaim".

See also
 The Tenth Level

References

External links
 
 
 
 

2015 films
2015 biographical drama films
2010s historical drama films
American biographical drama films
American historical drama films
Drama films based on actual events
Films set in 1961
Films set in the 1960s
Films shot in New York City
Films directed by Michael Almereyda
2015 drama films
2010s English-language films
2010s American films